DESE Research, Inc., is a veteran-owned, small-business firm conducting theoretical and analytical research services in the fields of Defense, Energy, Space, and Environment. DESE was formed in 1982 by former U.S. Army civil-service executive Dr. Wallace (Wally) Kirkpatrick. In addition to research accomplishments, DESE is recognized for high ethical standards and leadership in community services.

Locations

Corporate headquarters and primary operations are in the Cummings Research Park, Huntsville, Alabama. The firm also has offices serving Washington, D.C. and Leavenworth, Kansas.

Organization and management

Corporate managers
Chief executive officer – Michael A. Kirkpatrick
President – Michael A. Kirkpatrick
Senior Vice-President of Business Development – David F. Hemingway
Senior Vice-President of Enterprise Architecture - Shawn Wilson
Administration – Patricia Guinn

Directorates
Advanced Technology – H. Ray Sells
Cyber Security Programs - Bernie Froehlich
Leavenworth Operations – William E. Gevedon
Missile Systems Development – William T. Naff, Ph.D.
Simulation Applications – Dewayne Hall
Supply Chain Research - Bill Killingsworth, Ph.D
Systems Engineering and Test – Victor Dlugoszewski

Primary customers

At the present and in recent years, the client base of DESE has included the following Government Agencies and Business Industries.

Government agencies
Army Aviation and Missile Command; Army Combined Arms Center; Army Installation Management Command; Army Space and Missile Defense Command; Army Test and Evaluation Command; Army Training and Doctrine Command; Defense Intelligence Agency (Missile and Space Intelligence Center); Defense Threat Reduction Agency; Joint Systems Integration Center; Missile Defense Agency: NASA Marshall Space Flight Center; and Oak Ridge National Laboratory. DESE Research is certified by the General Services Administration under Professional Engineering Services and Information Technology Services.

Business industries
Boeing Company; Oshkosh Defense, LLC., CAS Group/Wyle; COLSA Corporation; Computer Sciences Corporation; Dynetics; General Dynamics; L3 Communications; Lockheed Martin Missiles and Space; Raytheon Company; Science Applications International Corporation; Teledyne Brown Engineering; plus others, mainly Small Businesses.

Areas of specialization

DESE offers the following primary areas of expertise and recently developed tools and processes.

Areas of expertise
Advanced software development; cyber security; database engineering; enterprise architecture; independent validation and verification; information assurance; intelligence, surveillance, and reconnaissance; interoperability certification; missile research and development; modeling and simulation; requirements analysis; test and evaluation; threat assessment; training; weapon system design.

DESE has received contracts, subcontracts, or Small Business Innovative Research (SBIR) awards in these areas. A number of the activities resulted in published papers and patents.

Simulation tools and processes
DESE is recognized for developing simulation and modeling software tools. NASA's heavy-lift vehicle projects use a DESE-developed code for their primary flight simulation In an unusual practice, DESE has made some of its simulations available to the public as open-source code, permitting users to study, change, improve, and, at times, distribute the software.

DESE literature cites the following recently developed and used major tools and processes.
C++ Model Developer – simulation kernel for quickly building dynamic simulations
Digital Glue – scripting languages to make software interoperable
T-Frames – universal architecture for high-fidelity missile engagement simulations
MAVERIC – high-fidelity simulation used in developing heavy-lift vehicles
Genetic Algorithms – optimization technique using survival-of-the fittest principles
Mini-Rocket – easy-to configure, multiple-degree-of-freedom flyout trajectory model   
Collection Asset Visualization  – optimizing location of intelligence sensors
Flight Path threat assessment – identifying and avoiding MANPADS threat areas
Battle Command Common Operational Architecture – JTF through Company HQs
System-of-Systems Mission Threads – basis for Army Interoperability Certification

References

External links 
DESE Research Official Web Site; http://www.dese.com/

Defense companies of the United States
Companies based in Huntsville, Alabama
Companies established in 1982
1982 establishments in Alabama